Firelord (Pyreus Kril) is a fictional character appearing in American comic books published by Marvel Comics.

Publication history

Firelord first appears in Thor #225 (July 1974) and was created by writer Gerry Conway and penciler John Buscema.

Fictional character biography
Pyreus Kril is a Xandarian who was born on the planet Xandar, in the Andromeda Galaxy. He is a graduate of the Nova Corps Academy, the military and exploratory force of the planet Xandar. During his commission, he served aboard a Xandarian ship under the command of Gabriel Lan. Gabriel and Pyreus became friends, until Gabriel was abducted by the cosmic entity Galactus and transformed into the herald the Air-Walker. Pyreus assumes command as captain and begins an obsessive search for Gabriel. Pyreus eventually locates Galactus' vessel and confronts the entity, only to discover that Gabriel was killed in combat. Galactus tells this to Pyreus only after the Xandarian agrees to serve him as his latest herald.

Pyreus is then transformed into Firelord, and after a period of servitude asked for his freedom. Galactus agrees on the condition that Firelord first find a replacement. Firelord travels to Earth and after an encounter with the Thunder God Thor and Hercules is freed when Thor presents Galactus with the armor of the Asgardian Destroyer to animate and use as a herald. After aiding Thor on several occasions, Firelord returns to deep space. He returns months later with the Shi'ar agent Erik the Red, who tricks Firelord into battling the X-Men.

Several years later Firelord discovers that Thor has battled a robot replica of the Air-Walker, and after revealing the origin of the two heralds to Thor returns to space with the remains of the android. Firelord later encounters Spider-Man in a fight - albeit one provoked by humans who drove Firelord into a temper because they believed that he was a mutant - but he was defeated by the wall-crawler due to Spider-Man's hit-and-run approach serving as an effective counter to Firelord's brute raw power. Firelord also meets the superhero team the Avengers, and assists them against the space-pirate Nebula. Firelord has since aided his fellow herald Silver Surfer on a number of occasions, particularly against the threat of Morg, Galactus' most brutal herald. Firelord assisted Thor in his battle against Thanos and his thrall Mangog. Firelord and Air-Walker also helped Nova and the New Warriors fight the Xandarian villain Supernova.

Annihilation

Firelord battles the Annihilation Wave alongside his fellow heralds, including Red Shift and Stardust. Although wounded at one point, Firelord recovers and now seeks vengeance against the remnants of the forces of Annihilus as they destroyed his home-world of Xandar.

Powers and abilities
Pyreus Kril was a normal Xandarian man until transformed by Galactus. Given mastery over the cosmic flame, Firelord wields a flaming staff and is capable of energy projection via his eyes and staff. Like all heralds, the Power Cosmic provides Firelord with superhuman strength, reflexes and durability, flight, mastery of the electromagnetic spectrum and total immunity to the rigors of space. Firelord is also capable of travelling faster than the speed of light.

Pyreus Kril graduated from the Xandarian Nova Corps Academy, and in addition to a thorough knowledge of combat has knowledge of advanced alien technology and space navigation.

Other versions

Guardians of the Galaxy
In the 31st century of Earth-691, Firelord is an ally of the Guardians of the Galaxy. He is known as "Protector of the Universe", but does not wear the Quantum Bands traditionally assigned to the holder of the role. He soon joins the sub-group, the Galactic Guardians.

Heroes Reborn
Firelord serves Galactus alongside his fellow heralds, with the entire group being worshiped by the Inhumans.

Marvel Zombies 2
Firelord appears as one of the "cosmic zombies' who return to Earth 40 years after the original infection. He has assisted the original space-faring group in eating nearly every sentient being in the galaxy. His jaw is literally broken so he can not speak. The returning zombies eventually regain control over their minds and cravings. The sole exception is the Hulk, who tries to eat the last of the human race. Firelord is destroyed while trying to stop him with his own staff smashing his head off.

In other media

Television
 Firelord appears in the 1994 Fantastic Four episode "Silver Surfer and the Coming of Galactus" Part 2 voiced by Alan Oppenheimer.
 Firelord appears in The Super Hero Squad Show episode "Last Exit Before Doomsday". He is shown as one of the heralds of Galactus.
 Firelord appears in The Avengers: Earth's Mightiest Heroes final episode "Avengers Assemble". He is seen as one of Galactus' four heralds and is depicted as a fire construct rather than an actual alien. He and the other heralds are sent by Galactus to build machines that will assist Galactus in consuming Earth. He attempts to establish his machine inside an active volcano, and is confronted by a team consisting of Scott Lang, Black Panther, Hulk, Winter Soldier, and Invisible Woman. Under Black Panther's leadership, Invisible Woman traps Firelord underneath a box-shaped force field, depriving him of oxygen. Firelord then briefly overwhelms the force field but a powerful thunderclap by Hulk sends a powerful wind which disintegrates and presumably kills Firelord.
 Firelord appears in the Hulk and the Agents of S.M.A.S.H. episode "Planet Hulk" Pt. 2, voiced by John DiMaggio. He is depicted as Galactus' latest herald, after he says that Terrax failed Galactus, and melted him. After helping his master consume Ego the Living Planet, as part of the deal he made with Ronan the Accuser, is confronted by the Agents of S.M.A.S.H. until he is defeated and taken to Galactus' ship. In the battle against the Leader, Firelord was saved by the Agents of S.M.A.S.H. and helps them stop the Leader, until they discover that the Kree anti-matter device would kill Ego, Hulk, and Galactus by consuming it. After destroying the device, and by telling Galactus that Ronan tricked him into destroying it by consuming Ego being tampered with, Firelord leaves with Galactus to make the Kree pay for his betrayal.

Video games
 Firelord is featured as a boss in the Silver Surfer video game.

References

External links
 

Characters created by Gerry Conway
Characters created by John Buscema
Fictional characters with fire or heat abilities
Marvel Comics aliens
Marvel Comics characters who can move at superhuman speeds
Marvel Comics characters with superhuman strength
Marvel Comics extraterrestrial superheroes
Marvel Comics superheroes